General elections are scheduled to be held in Luxembourg by October 2023. All 60 seats of the Chamber of Deputies will be renewed.

The incumbent Bettel–Schneider Ministry is a coalition of the Democratic Party (DP), the Luxembourg Socialist Workers' Party (LSAP) and The Greens.

Electoral system
The 60 members of the Chamber of Deputies are elected by proportional representation in four multi-member constituencies; nine in North constituency, seven in East, 23 in South and 21 in Centre. Voters can vote for a party list or cast multiple votes for as many candidates as there are seats. Seat allocation is calculated in accordance with the Hagenbach-Bischoff quota.

Only Luxembourgish citizens may vote in general elections. A proposal to extend voting rights to foreigners who have lived in Luxembourg for at least ten years and have previously voted in a European or local election in Luxembourg, was rejected in a 2015 referendum. Voting is mandatory for eligible Luxembourg citizens who live in Luxembourg and are under 75 years of age. Luxembourg citizens who live abroad may vote by post at the commune in which they most recently lived in Luxembourg. Luxembourg citizens who were born in Luxembourg but have never lived there may vote by post at the commune in which they were born. Luxembourg citizens who were not born in Luxembourg and have never lived there may vote by post at the commune of Luxembourg City.

Parties

Opinion polls

Voting intention

Seat projections

References

Chamber of Deputies (Luxembourg) elections
Luxembourg
Luxembourg
2023 in Luxembourg